Erie is a city in and the county seat of Neosho County, Kansas, United States, and situated in the valley of the Neosho River, about a mile Northeast of the river.  As of the 2020 census, the population of the city was 1,047.

History
In 1866, the proprietors of these two towns made a compromise to abandon the towns and combine with the settlement at the present Erie site. Four men gave 40 acres each, that butted together, out of their 160-acre shares, to create the city plat of Erie. These men were: David Bray, Luther Puckett, John Himmelwright and Peter Walter. In November of that year the Erie Town Company was formed. Each member of this company donated forty acres of land in the center of Section 32, Township 28, Range 20 east. Each member was to buy city plots and improve them.

Erie's first fire company was established in November 1866; its charter members were those men who had donated the land on which the community was built.  The first log home in Erie was built in 1866, while the first businesses were built in the following year.  By 1883, the city had two general stores, two blacksmith shops, one drug store, two hotels, one newspaper office, two churches, and a population of about 300.

Erie was incorporated on December 25, 1869.  On December 30, the trustees met and declared Erie to be a city of the 3rd class.

In 1872, Erie was designated the county seat of Neosho County, defeating "Osage Mission" (later renamed Saint Paul) in a contentious election.  After a lawsuit reached the Kansas Supreme Court, Erie retained the position of county seat.

Geography
Erie is located at  (37.568548, -95.242562).

Climate
The climate in this area is characterized by hot, humid summers and generally mild to cool winters.  According to the Köppen Climate Classification system, Erie has a humid subtropical climate, abbreviated "Cfa" on climate maps.

Demographics

2010 census
As of the census of 2010, there were 1,150 people, 463 households, and 312 families residing in the city. The racial makeup of the city was 96.4% White, 0.3% African American, 1.1% Native American, 0.1% Asian, 1.3% from other races, and 0.8% from two or more races. Hispanic or Latino of any race were 5.6% of the population.

There were 463 households, of which 30.7% had children under the age of 18 living with them, 55.1% were married couples living together, 6.9% had a female householder with no husband present, 5.4% had a male householder with no wife present, and 32.6% were non-families. 28.7% of all households were made up of individuals, and 17.3% had someone living alone who was 65 years of age or older. The average household size was 2.42 and the average family size was 2.89.

The median age in the city was 41.5 years. 24.9% of residents were under the age of 18; 8% were between the ages of 18 and 24; 20.9% were from 25 to 44; 25.5% were from 45 to 64; and 20.5% were 65 years of age or older. The gender makeup of the city was 49.6% male and 50.4% female.

2000 census
As of the census of 2000, there were 1,211 people, 492 households, and 318 families residing in the city. The racial makeup of the city was 97.11% White, 0.17% African American, 0.91% Native American, 0.08% Asian, 0.74% from other races, and 0.99% from two or more races. Hispanic or Latino of any race were 1.82% of the population.

There were 492 households, out of which 27.2% had children under the age of 18 living with them, 54.3% were married couples living together, 6.5% had a female householder with no husband present, and 35.2% were non-families. 31.7% of all households were made up of individuals, and 17.7% had someone living alone who was 65 years of age or older. The average household size was 2.35 and the average family size was 2.96.

In the city, the population was spread out, with 24.9% under the age of 18, 7.8% from 18 to 24, 23.5% from 25 to 44, 24.0% from 45 to 64, and 19.9% who were 65 years of age or older. The median age was 40 years. For every 100 females, there were 89.2 males. For every 100 females age 18 and over, there were 88.4 males.

The median income for a household in the city was $30,568, and the median income for a family was $39,048. Males had a median income of $27,137 versus $18,672 for females. The per capita income for the city was $17,019. About 9.1% of families and 14.9% of the population were below the poverty line, including 18.5% of those under age 18 and 18.7% of those age 65 or over.

Extension service
On July 1, 2010, the Neosho County Extension Service joined with the Allen County Extension Service to form the Southwind Extension District, headquartered in Erie. The Extension Service's mission is to help country residents with questions about their lawn and garden, crops and livestock, health and nutrition and family living. In addition the Extension Service sponsors youth development through the 4-H program. The Extension program is jointly administered by Kansas State University Research and Extension and the joint Extension Board, with members from both Neosho and Allen Counties.

The Neosho County Fair, held at the fairgrounds in Erie, is also generally held around the third week of July. This includes entries from 4-H and FFA members and also open class entries from residents in the community. The Neosho County Fair is operated by Neosho County Extension Service and the Neosho County Fair Association, a 501(c)(5) non-profit corporation founded in 1956.

Old Soldiers and Sailors Reunion
Erie is famous for its annual Old Soldiers and Sailors Reunion held during the second full week of July, including the annual Free Bean Feed. This reunion has been conducted continuously since 1873 and is claimed to be the oldest consecutively running Old Soldiers and Sailors Reunion in the country.

Salt pork and navy beans were a staple food for soldiers in the Civil War. So it was natural to serve kettles of beans during these reunions. Soon it became a tradition. Now over 1,400 pounds of beans are cooked in more than 50 iron kettles on the Courthouse lawn by the American Legion Post.  Other events include the Rodeo held on Tuesday and Wednesday evenings during Reunion Week.  The Old Soldiers and Sailors Reunion culminates on Friday night when Mainstreet Memories brings in Country and Western Recording Artists from Nashville each year.

Education
The Unified School District 101 (USD 101) serves Erie, Galesburg, Stark and rural Parsons in Neosho County. On September 18, 2007 the district passed a $21.9 million bond issue. They built a new green high school in Erie which opened for classes in the Fall 2010 semester. In addition, they have rebuilt the old high school into a grade school facility and added a new gym at Galesburg Middle School. The mascot for Erie High School is the Red Devil. The mascot for Galesburg Middle School is the Timber Wolf.

The demolition of the old Erie Grade and Middle School brick building began in May 2013 and lasted into July, with the Amish assisting.

See also
 Great Flood of 1951

References

Further reading

External links
 
 Erie - Directory of Public Officials
 USD 101, local school district
 Erie city map, KDOT

Cities in Kansas
County seats in Kansas
Cities in Neosho County, Kansas
Populated places established in 1866
1866 establishments in Kansas